Sora ( "Sky") is Japanese recording artist Yui Aragaki's debut album. It was released on December 5, 2007.

Background 
The album includes the theme song to the film Koizora, which stars Aragaki herself. It was released in two formats: CD+DVD standard edition and a limited edition which has an illustration cover drawn by Aragaki herself and comes priced at 1,890 yen. The standard edition DVD includes the music video and making of footage of "Heavenly Days".

Chart performance 
Sora debuted on the daily Oricon albums chart at #2 with 11,499 copies sold. It peaked at #3 on the weekly charts with 72,879 copies sold, making Aragaki the first actress-turned-singer in four years (since Kou Shibasaki) to have her debut album open in the top 3. Sora was the 10th best selling album for the month of December 2007. It was 160th (2007) and 167th (2008) on the yearly Oricon albums chart.

Track listing

Charts, sales and certifications

Chart positions

Sales and certifications

Release history

References

External links 

2007 debut albums
Yui Aragaki albums
Warner Music Japan albums